Hollywood is a 1989 novel by Charles Bukowski which fictionalizes his experiences writing the screenplay for the film Barfly and taking part in its tumultuous journey to the silver screen. It is narrated in the first person.

Plot
Adopting the stylized alter-ego, Henry 'Hank' Chinaski, a character used in previous novels, this book relates his experiences of working with a director, finding financial backing, losing financial backing, writing the screenplay and finally completing the film, Barfly. The seemingly preposterous exchanges and occurrences within these pages leave the reader with the conviction that Hank Chinaski's life was truly stranger than fiction.

Writing
The novel is a roman à clef, in which Bukowski is named Henry Chinaski, and his wife Linda is named Sarah. His friend, the poet John Thomas Idlet, is named John Galt. His German translator Carl Weissner is named Karl Vossner. Photographer Michael Montfort is named Michael Huntington. The film Barfly is named The Dance of Jim Beam. Film company Cannon is named Firepower. Bukowski uses the following names as pseudonyms for the people with whom he worked on the movie.

 Mickey Rourke, the lead actor in the film, is named Jack Bledsoe
 Faye Dunaway, the lead actress, is named Francine Bowers
 Barbet Schroeder, the director, is named Jon Pinchot.
 Idi Amin, the subject of Schroeder's earlier documentary film, is named Lido Mamin
 Menahem Golan, co-producer, is named Harry Friedman
 Yoram Globus, co-producer, is named Nate Fischman
 Robby Müller, cameraman, is named Hyans
 Éva Gárdos, the editor, is named Kay Bronstein
 Frank Stallone is named Lenny Fidelo

He also references people he met in Hollywood during his time working on the movie:

 Tom Jones is named Tab Jones
 Edward R. Pressman is named Harold Pheasant 
 Dennis Hopper is named Mack Austin
 Sean Penn is named Tom Pell
 Madonna is named Ramona
 Norman Mailer is named Victor Norman
 David Lynch is named Manz Loeb
 Isabella Rossellini is named Rosalind Bonelli
 Werner Herzog is named Wenner Zergog
 Taylor Hackford is named Hector Blackford
 Roger Ebert is named Rick Talbot
 Jean-Luc Godard is named Jon-Luc Modard
 Timothy Leary is named Jim Serry
 Anton Corbijn is named Corbell Veeker
 Steve Baës is named Francois Racine
 Francis Ford Coppola is named Frances Ford Lopalla

Filming
Though officially engaged only as screenplay writer, Bukowski appeared in the background of one scene, sitting at the bar with the other "barflies." Schroeder already had filmed a series of 52 short interviews with Bukowski, assembled under the title The Charles Bukowski Tapes. Footage later was used in a 2003 documentary on the author titled Bukowski: Born into This.

References

External links
 (a review of the book followed by a very short interview with Bukowski)

 Hollywood Quotes

1989 American novels
Novels by Charles Bukowski
American autobiographical novels
Hollywood novels